William A. Adamson (May 5, 1834March 1, 1907) was a Canadian American immigrant, farmer, and Republican politician.  He served one term in the Wisconsin State Assembly, representing western Fond du Lac County.  He later served as sergeant-at-arms of the Assembly during the 1887–1888 session.

Biography
William A. Adamson was born on May 5, 1834, in Kingston, Upper Canada.  He emigrated to the United States with his parents in 1837, settling in Jefferson County, New York.  He received a common school education until age 14, when he joined the crew of a ship.  He spent the next decade in seafaring.  He came to Wisconsin in 1856 and settled at Eldorado, in Fond du Lac County.

He became associated with the Republican Party and, in 1879, he was elected assistant sergeant-at-arms of the Wisconsin State Assembly.  That fall, he was elected to the Assembly from Fond du Lac County's 1st Assembly district.  He served only one term and was not a candidate for re-election.  He returned to the Assembly in the 1885–1886 session as assistant sergeant-at-arms, and was then elected sergeant-at-arms for the 1887–1888 session.

He died March 1, 1907, at his home in Eldorado after an illness of several months.

Electoral history

Wisconsin Assembly (1879)

| colspan="6" style="text-align:center;background-color: #e9e9e9;"| General Election, November 4, 1879

References

 

 

1834 births
1907 deaths
Pre-Confederation Canadian emigrants to the United States
People from Jefferson County, New York
People from Fond du Lac County, Wisconsin
Farmers from Wisconsin
Republican Party members of the Wisconsin State Assembly
19th-century American politicians